James "Bull" Draper was an American football player and coach. He served as the head football coach at Mount St. Mary's College—now known as Mount St. Mary's University–in Emmitsburg, Maryland from 1939 to 1941. Draper played college football at Western Maryland College and professionally for the Baltimore Orioles of the Dixie League.

References

Year of birth missing
Year of death missing
American football halfbacks
American football quarterbacks
McDaniel Green Terror football players
Mount St. Mary's Mountaineers baseball coaches
Mount St. Mary's Mountaineers football coaches